is a Japanese architect.

Biography

Itsuko Hasegawa was born in Yaizu City, Japan in 1941. She studied at the Department of Architecture at Kanto Gakuin University, graduating in 1964. From then until 1969, she worked with Kiyonori Kikutake and then spent two years studying at Tokyo Institute of Technology. From 1971-78 she worked under Kazuo Shinohara at the institute. She has lectured in Rotterdam, Australia, Norway and Los Angeles between 1984-7. She became the principal of her own design studio in Tokyo, called Itsuko Hasegawa Architectural Design Studio in 1976, which was renamed the Architectural Design Studio in 1979.

In 1987, Hasegawa won first prize in a competition to design the Shonandai Cultural Centre. Initially, the design was not popular among the local residents, who were concerned on how the building would be buried below ground level. However, Hasegawa had many discussions with the residents, and when the opening phase of construction began in late 1989, the building was met with unanimous approval.

In the summer of 1989, Hasegawa completed a design for the 270-seat theatre for the temporary four-month Nagoya Design exhibition.

Hasegawa won an open competition for the design of the Niigata Performing Arts Centre. The project contains a 1,900-seat concert hall, a 900-seat theatre, and a 375-seat Noh theatre, and is surrounded by an eight-hectare landscape. The venue was constructed atop reclaimed land that used to be part of the Shinano River.

Hasegawa is an Honorary Fellow of the Royal Institute of British Architects, and has received the Avon Arts Award, the Building Contractor's Society Prize for the Shonandai Cultural Center, the Cultural Award for Residential Architecture (Fukuoka, Japan), and a Design Prize from the Architectural Institute of Japan.

Selected buildings 

 Tokumaru children's clinic, Ehime (1979)
 Aono building, Ehime (1980)
 Bizan Hall, Shizuoka (1984)
 Sugai Internal Clinic, Ehime (1986)
 Shonandai Cultural Centre (1987-1990) (Competition awarded 1987.  Design, 1987-1988; construction, 1989-1990)
 Cardiff Bay Opera House; Japan Architect, 19, 68-71, Autumn 1995
 Himi Seaside Botanical Garden; Japan Architect, 19, 64-67, Autumn 1995
 Yamanashi Fruit Museum and Garden; Japan Architect, 19, 48-57, Autumn 1995
 Niigata City Performing Arts Centre; 1993-1998. Japan Architect, 19, 44-47, Autumn 1995
 Sumida Culture Factory, 1994
 Namekawa Housing, 1998

Selected awards 
 Design Prize from the Architectural Institute of Japan for the Bizan Hall (1986)
 Japan Cultural Design Award for residential projects
 Elected as an Honorary Fellows of RIBA
 Japan Art Academy Award (2000)
 Honorary Degree Award from University College London
 Elected as an Honorary Fellow of AIA

Selected writings 

 Itsuko Hasegawa, Academy Editions, 1993. .
 Itsuko Hasegawa, with Stephen Dobney, Images Pub. Group, 1997. .
 Island Hopping - Crossover Architecture, NAi Publishers, 2000. .

References

Further reading
 J'Lit | Authors : Itsuko Hasegawa | Books from Japan 
 Itsuko Hasegawa and Anne Sch-Eou, Itsuko Hasegawa: Recent Buildings and Projects, Birkhauser Verlag AG; Princeton Architectural Press, May 1997. .
 Phoebe Chow, "Museum of Fruit", The Architectural Review, March, 1996, Volume CXCIX. No 1189.
 UIUC Women in Architecture
 International Archive of Women in Architecture

External links
 Itsuko Hasegawa Atelier - Official Homepage

Japanese architects
1941 births
Living people
People from Yaizu, Shizuoka
Tokyo Institute of Technology alumni
Kanto Gakuin University alumni
Japanese women architects